Seeboard, formerly South Eastern Electricity Board (SEEB), was a British electricity company. The electrical power industry in the United Kingdom was nationalised by the Electricity Act 1947, when over 600 electric power companies were merged into 12 area boards, one of which was the South Eastern Electricity Board. It acquired the former Princes Hotel (now King's House) on the seafront in Hove, East Sussex, and converted it into its headquarters. The building was refurbished and substantially extended between 1979 and 1981.

The key people on the board were: Charles George Morley New (d.1957) (1948–55), Chairman Harold V. Pugh (1964), E. Sinnott (1967), Deputy Chairman E. Sinnott (1964), A. G. Milne (1967), full-time member E. Peel (1964, 1967).

The total number of customers supplied by the board was:

The amount of electricity, in GWh, sold by the South Eastern Electricity Board over its operational life was:

Post privatisation 
On 31 March 1990 the area electricity boards were changed to independent regional electricity companies (REC), and Seeboard plc was formed. On 11 December 1990 the RECs were privatised.  The Hove headquarters was closed in 1994, but some jobs were transferred to a nearby Seeboard office in Portslade.

Seeboard Powerlink, a company owned by Seeboard, BICC and ABB, was awarded (on 13 August 1998) a 30-year contract to operate, maintain, finance and renew London Underground's high-voltage power distribution network, under the terms of the UK government's private finance initiative.  Seeboard Powerlink became responsible for distribution of high-voltage electricity supplies to London Underground's substations and more than 400 kilometres (250 miles) of track. The contract included significant capital construction and installation works on the LUL power system valued at approximately £100 million.

In 2002 Seeboard joined 24seven Utility Services under the ownership of the LE Group, which then rebranded in 2003 to become EDF Energy Networks, the UK branch of Électricité de France, before being acquired by Cheung Kong Holdings and renamed UK Power Networks.

Bibliography

References

External links
 EDF Energy website
 EDF Energy's Fuel Mix for 2006
 BalfourBeatty press release 1998-08-13/

Companies based in Brighton and Hove
Électricité de France
Former nationalised industries of the United Kingdom
Electric power companies of the United Kingdom
Utilities of England
1947 establishments in England